Trombetti is a surname of Italian origin. People with that name include:

 Alfredo Trombetti (1866–1929), Italian linguist
 Ascanio Trombetti (1544–1590), Italian composer
 Luisa Trombetti (born 1993), Italian swimmer who competed at the 2016 Summer Olympics

Surnames of Italian origin